Geologfjord is a fjord in King Christian X Land, East Greenland. Administratively it belongs to the Northeast Greenland National Park.

History
The fjord was named in 1899 by Swedish Arctic explorer and geologist A.G. Nathorst during the expedition he led to Greenland in search of survivors of S. A. Andrée's Arctic balloon expedition of 1897. The name was chosen owing to the spectacularly colored strata and rock formations in the shores of the fjord.

Geography
The Geologfjord is part of the Kaiser Franz Joseph Fjord complex. 
It runs roughly in a NW /SE direction with Andrée Land to the west and Strindberg Land to the east. The Nunatak Glacier has its terminus at its head. The smaller Endeløs and Dukke Glacier flow into the fjord from the west.

Bjorne Island, a rocky islet, rises close to the mouth of the fjord, north of Cape Weber, the easternmost end of Andrée Land. To the south the fjord opens into the northern shore of the Kaiser Franz Joseph Fjord and Cape Ovibos is the headland at the eastern side of the entrance.

See also
List of fjords of Greenland

Bibliography
 Spencer Apollonio, Lands That Hold One Spellbound: A Story of East Greenland, 2008

References

External links

Den grønlandske Lods - Sejladsanvisninger Østgrønland 
Glacitectonic deformations in East Greenland

Fjords of Greenland